Alan Boyle is an American journalist specializing in science and technology news. He worked for msnbc.com and NBC News Digital as science editor from 1996 to 2015. In 2015, he became aerospace and science editor for GeekWire. Boyle is also president of the Council for the Advancement of Science Writing.

Career
Boyle runs a virtual curiosity shop covering physical sciences, space exploration, paleontology, among many other interests of his. He joined NBC News Digital in 1996, and went on to GeekWire in 2015. He has maintained a blog called Cosmic Log, since 2002. During his career in journalism, he has worked in Cincinnati, Spokane, and Seattle.

Honors and awards
He has received recognition from the American Association for the Advancement of Science in the form of the 2002 AAAS Science Journalism Award. He has also won awards from the National Academies, the National Association of Science Writers, the Society of Professional Journalists, the Space Frontier Foundation, IEEE-USA, the Pirelli Relativity Challenge and the CMU Cybersecurity Journalism Awards program.

Bibliography
 
 Contributor to "A Field Guide for Science Writers"

References

American science journalists
American male journalists
Living people
American online journalists
Year of birth missing (living people)